Miconia is a large genus of tropical and subtropical New World flowering shrubs and trees in the family Melastomaceae. , there are over 1,100 accepted species in Kew's Plants of the World Online.

Species

A
 Miconia abbreviata Markgr.
 Miconia abeggii Urb. & Ekman
 Miconia abscondita Majure, Judd & Skean
 Miconia abysmophila Wurdack
 Miconia acalephoides Naudin
 Miconia acanthocoryne Wurdack
 Miconia acinodendron Sweet
 Miconia acreana Ule
 Miconia acuminata Naudin
 Miconia acuminifera Triana
 Miconia acunae Borhidi
 Miconia acunagalei Judd, Bécquer & Majure
 Miconia acutifolia Ule
 Miconia acutipetala Sprague
 Miconia adenocalyx Urb. & Ekman
 Miconia adinantha Wurdack
 Miconia adrienii J.F.Macbr.
 Miconia aenigmatica Wurdack
 Miconia aequatorialis Wurdack
 Miconia aeruginosa Naudin
 Miconia affinis DC.
 Miconia aggregata Gleason
 Miconia aguilarii (Kriebel & Almeda) Gamba & Almeda
 Miconia aguirrei L.Uribe
 Miconia aguitensis Gleason
 Miconia alainii Judd & Skean
 Miconia alata (Aubl.) DC.
 Miconia alatissima Gamba & Almeda
 Miconia alberti Gleason
 Miconia albertobrenesii Gamba & Almeda
 Miconia albicans (Sw.) Steud.
 Miconia albiviridis Urb. & Ekman
 Miconia alboglandulosa Gamba & Almeda
 Miconia alborosea L.Uribe
 Miconia alborufescens Naudin
 Miconia aligera Wurdack
 Miconia aliquantula Wurdack
 Miconia alloeotricha (Urb.) Judd, Penneys & Skean
 Miconia alpestris Cogn. ex Donn.Sm.
 Miconia alpina Cogn.
 Miconia alternans Naudin
 Miconia alternifolia (Griseb.) Alain
 Miconia altissima Cogn.
 Miconia alypifolia Naudin
 Miconia amabilis Cogn.
 Miconia amacurensis Wurdack
 Miconia amambayensis Kraenzl.
 Miconia amazonica Triana
 Miconia amblyandra Naudin
 Miconia amilcariana Almeda & Dorr
 Miconia amissa Wurdack
 Miconia amnicola Wurdack
 Miconia amoena Triana
 Miconia ampla Triana
 Miconia amplexicaulis Naudin
 Miconia amplinodis Umaña & Almeda
 Miconia anchicayensis Gamba & Almeda
 Miconia ancistrophora Triana
 Miconia andersonii Fawc. & Rendle
 Miconia andreana Cogn.
 Miconia androsaemifolia Griseb.
 Miconia angelana R.Romero & R.Goldenb.
 Miconia angustilamina (Judd & Skean) Judd & Ionta
 Miconia anisophylla Triana
 Miconia anisotricha Triana
 Miconia annulata Triana
 Miconia antioquiensis Wurdack
 Miconia apiculata Urb. & Ekman
 Miconia aplostachya (Humb. & Bonpl.) DC.
 Miconia aponeura Triana
 Miconia appendiculata Triana
 Miconia approximata Gamba & Almeda
 Miconia aprica Gleason
 Miconia araguensis Wurdack
 Miconia arboricola Almeda
 Miconia arbutifolia Naudin
 Miconia archeri Wurdack
 Miconia argentea DC.
 Miconia argentimuricata Majure & Judd
 Miconia argyraea Cogn.
 Miconia argyrophylla DC.
 Miconia aristata Gleason
 Miconia ascendens Wurdack
 Miconia ascenditricha Judd, Bécquer & Majure
 Miconia asclepiadea Triana
 Miconia aspergillaris Naudin
 Miconia asperifolia (Naudin) Majure & Judd
 Miconia asperrima Triana
 Miconia asplundii Wurdack
 Miconia aspratilis Wurdack
 Miconia astrocalyx Meirelles & R.Goldenb.
 Miconia astroplocama Donn.Sm.
 Miconia astrotricha Triana
 Miconia atlantica Caddah & R.Goldenb.
 Miconia atrofusca Cogn.
 Miconia atropilis Cogn. & Gleason
 Miconia atropurpurea Gamba & Almeda
 Miconia augusti Cogn.
 Miconia aulocalyx Mart. ex Triana
 Miconia aurantiaca (Almeda & Kriebel) Gamba & Almeda
 Miconia aurea (D.Don) Naudin
 Miconia aureoides Cogn.
 Miconia auritinoda Wurdack
 Miconia avia Wurdack
 Miconia axinaeoides Gleason
 Miconia ayacuchensis Wurdack
 Miconia aymardii Wurdack

B
 Miconia bailloniana J.F.Macbr.
 Miconia bangii Cogn.
 Miconia baracoensis Urb.
 Miconia barbata (Borhidi) Judd, Bécquer & Majure
 Miconia barbeyana Cogn.
 Miconia barbinervis Triana
 Miconia barbipilis Gleason
 Miconia barclayana Wurdack
 Miconia barkeri Urb. & Ekman
 Miconia basilensis Urb. & Ekman
 Miconia baumgratziana R.Goldenb. & C.V.Martin
 Miconia bella Wurdack
 Miconia beneolens Wurdack
 Miconia benoistii Wurdack
 Miconia bensparrei Gamba & Almeda
 Miconia benthamiana Triana
 Miconia bernardii Wurdack
 Miconia berryi Wurdack
 Miconia biacuta Cogn.
 Miconia biappendiculata (Naudin) L.Uribe
 Miconia bicolor Triana
 Miconia biformis Cogn.
 Miconia biglandulosa Gleason
 Miconia biglomerata DC.
 Miconia bilopezii Wurdack
 Miconia biolleyana (Cogn.) Gamba & Almeda
 Miconia bipatrialis Wurdack
 Miconia biperulifera Cogn.
 Miconia bisulcata Urb.
 Miconia blakeifolia Gleason
 Miconia boekei (Wurdack) Gamba & Almeda
 Miconia bolivarensis Wurdack
 Miconia boliviensis Cogn.
 Miconia boomii Wurdack
 Miconia bordoncilloana Lozano & M.E.Morales
 Miconia borhidiana Judd, Bécquer & Majure
 Miconia borjensis Wurdack
 Miconia boxii Wurdack
 Miconia brachyanthera Triana
 Miconia brachybotrya Triana
 Miconia brachycalyx Triana
 Miconia brachygyna Gleason
 Miconia brachystemon (Urb.) Judd, Bécquer & Majure
 Miconia bracteata Triana
 Miconia bracteolata DC.
 Miconia bractiflora Gamba & Almeda
 Miconia brasiliensis (Spreng.) Triana
 Miconia breteleri Wurdack
 Miconia brevipes Benth.
 Miconia brevis J.F.Macbr.
 Miconia brevistylis Cogn.
 Miconia brevitheca Gleason
 Miconia brittonii Cogn. ex Britton
 Miconia brunnea DC.
 Miconia bubalina Naudin
 Miconia bucherae Alain
 Miconia buddlejoides Triana
 Miconia bullata Triana
 Miconia bullotricha Bécquer & Majure
 Miconia buntingii Wurdack
 Miconia burchellii Triana
 Miconia buxifolia Naudin

C
 Miconia cabucu Hoehne
 Miconia cacatin (Aubl.) S.S.Renner
 Miconia cacumina Wurdack
 Miconia caelata DC.
 Miconia caerulea Naudin
 Miconia caesariata Wurdack
 Miconia caesia Cogn. & Gleason
 Miconia caiuia E.C.O.Chagas & R.Goldenb.
 Miconia cajalbanensis Judd, Bécquer & Majure
 Miconia cajanumana Wurdack
 Miconia calignosa Wurdack
 Miconia calophylla Triana
 Miconia calvescens DC.
 Miconia calycina Cogn.
 Miconia calycopteris (Rich.) Judd, Bécquer & Majure
 Miconia campanensis Urb. & Ekman
 Miconia campestris Triana
 Miconia campii Wurdack
 Miconia canaguensis Wurdack
 Miconia cannabina Markgr.
 Miconia capitellata Cogn.
 Miconia capixaba R.Goldenb.
 Miconia carassana Cogn.
 Miconia cardenasiae Jan.M.Burke & Michelang.
 Miconia carnea Cogn.
 Miconia carpishana Wurdack
 Miconia carvalhoana Baumgratz & D'El Rei Souza
 Miconia castaneifolia Naudin
 Miconia castillensis Wurdack
 Miconia castrensis Wurdack
 Miconia cataractae Triana
 Miconia caucana Gleason
 Miconia caudata DC.
 Miconia caudiculata Pittier
 Miconia caudigera DC.
 Miconia cauingia J.F.Macbr.
 Miconia cautis Wurdack
 Miconia cazaletii Wurdack
 Miconia celaquensis Almeda
 Miconia centrodesma Naudin
 Miconia centrodesmoides Wurdack
 Miconia centronioides Gleason
 Miconia centrophora Naudin
 Miconia centrosperma Almeda
 Miconia ceramicarpa (DC.) Cogn.
 Miconia cerasiflora Urb.
 Miconia cercophora Wurdack
 Miconia cernua Naudin
 Miconia chaetodon Naudin
 Miconia chamissois Naudin
 Miconia chapensis E.Cotton & W.Meier
 Miconia chartacea Triana
 Miconia chemillensis L.A.Cárdenas
 Miconia chinantlana (Naudin) Almeda
 Miconia chionophila Naudin
 Miconia chiriquiensis Almeda
 Miconia chlorocarpa Cogn.
 Miconia chocoensis (Wurdack) Gamba & Almeda
 Miconia choriophylla Wurdack
 Miconia chrysocoma Gleason
 Miconia chrysoneura Triana
 Miconia chrysophylla Urb.
 Miconia ciliaris Triana
 Miconia ciliata (Rich.) DC.
 Miconia cinchonifolia DC.
 Miconia cineana Majure, Judd, Ionta & Skean
 Miconia cinerascens Miq.
 Miconia cinerea Cogn.
 Miconia cinereiformis Ionta, Judd & Skean
 Miconia cinnamomifolia Naudin
 Miconia cionotricha L.Uribe
 Miconia cipoensis R.Goldenb.
 Miconia cladonia Gleason
 Miconia clathrantha Triana
 Miconia cleefii L.Uribe
 Miconia clivorum Wurdack
 Miconia clypeata Wurdack
 Miconia cocoensis Almeda & Kriebel
 Miconia codonostigma Gleason ex Wurdack
 Miconia coelestis Naudin
 Miconia collatata Wurdack
 Miconia collayensis Wurdack
 Miconia coloradensis Almeda
 Miconia commutata Almeda
 Miconia comosa Cogn.
 Miconia compressa Naudin
 Miconia compressicaulis Wurdack
 Miconia comptifolia Wurdack
 Miconia concinna Almeda
 Miconia condylata Wurdack
 Miconia confertiflora Almeda
 Miconia conformis Wurdack
 Miconia coniophora Urb. & Ekman
 Miconia contrerasii Wurdack
 Miconia cookii Gleason
 Miconia corallina Spring ex Mart.
 Miconia corazonica Wurdack
 Miconia cordata Triana
 Miconia cordierorum Ionta & Judd
 Miconia cordifolia Wurdack
 Miconia coriacea DC.
 Miconia cornifolia (Desr.) Naudin
 Miconia cornuta (Lozano & N.Ruiz-R.) Almeda & Alvear
 Miconia coronata DC.
 Miconia coronifera Wurdack
 Miconia correae Almeda
 Miconia corymbiformis Cogn.
 Miconia cosangensis Wurdack
 Miconia costaricensis Cogn.
 Miconia costata (Urb.) Judd, Bécquer & Majure
 Miconia cowanii Wurdack
 Miconia crassifolia Triana
 Miconia crassinervia Cogn.
 Miconia crassipes Triana
 Miconia crassistigma Cogn.
 Miconia crebribullata Wurdack
 Miconia cremadena Gleason
 Miconia cremophylla Naudin
 Miconia crenata (Vahl) Michelang.
 Miconia cretacea Gleason
 Miconia crinita Naudin
 Miconia cristalensis (Borhidi) Judd, Bécquer & Majure
 Miconia crocata Almeda
 Miconia crocea Naudin
 Miconia crotonifolia (Desr.) Judd & Ionta
 Miconia cruenta Triana
 Miconia cuatrecasae Markgr. ex Cuatrec.
 Miconia cubacinerea Majure & Judd
 Miconia cubana (Alain) Majure & Judd
 Miconia cubatanensis Hoehne
 Miconia cubensis C.Wright
 Miconia cundinamarcensis Wurdack
 Miconia cuneata Triana
 Miconia cuprea Wurdack
 Miconia curta (Gleason) Wurdack
 Miconia curvipila (Urb. & Ekman) Ionta, Judd & Skean
 Miconia cuspidata Naudin
 Miconia cuspidatissima Pittier
 Miconia cutucuensis Wurdack
 Miconia cyanocarpa Naudin
 Miconia cyathanthera Triana

D
 Miconia daironii Michelang.
 Miconia danielii Almeda
 Miconia dapsiliflora Wurdack
 Miconia dasyclada Wurdack
 Miconia decipiens Cogn.
 Miconia decurrens Cogn.
 Miconia delicatula A.Rich.
 Miconia demissifolia Wurdack
 Miconia densifolia Cogn.
 Miconia denticulata Naudin
 Miconia depauperata Gardner
 Miconia desmantha Benth.
 Miconia desportesii Urb.
 Miconia diaphanea Gleason
 Miconia dichroa Cogn.
 Miconia dichrophylla J.F.Macbr.
 Miconia diegogomezii Kriebel & Almeda
 Miconia dielsiana Urb.
 Miconia dielsii Markgr.
 Miconia difficilis Triana
 Miconia dioica Wurdack
 Miconia dipsacea Naudin
 Miconia discoidea (Lozano & N.Ruiz-R.) Almeda & Alvear
 Miconia discolor DC.
 Miconia dispar Benth.
 Miconia dissimulans Wurdack
 Miconia dissita Almeda
 Miconia divaricata Gardner
 Miconia divergens Triana
 Miconia divisoriana Wurdack
 Miconia dodecandra Cogn.
 Miconia dodsonii Wurdack
 Miconia dolichopoda Naudin
 Miconia dolichorrhyncha Naudin
 Miconia domingensis Cogn.
 Miconia donaeana Naudin
 Miconia doriana Cogn.
 Miconia dorsaliporosa R.Goldenb. & Reginato
 Miconia dorsiloba Gleason
 Miconia duckei Cogn.
 Miconia dudleyi Wurdack
 Miconia dumetosa Cogn.
 Miconia dunstervillei Wurdack
 Miconia dura Triana

E
 Miconia echinata (Griseb.) Judd, Bécquer & Majure
 Miconia echinocarpa Judd, Bécquer & Majure
 Miconia ecostata Sweet ex Triana
 Miconia egensis Cogn.
 Miconia egregia Wurdack
 Miconia eichlerii Cogn.
 Miconia ekmanii (Urb.) Judd, Bécquer & Majure
 Miconia elaeodendrum (DC.) Naudin
 Miconia elaeoides Naudin
 Miconia elata (Sw.) DC.
 Miconia elegans Cogn.
 Miconia ellipsoidea (Urb. & Ekman) Ionta, Judd & Skean
 Miconia elongata Cogn.
 Miconia elvirae Wurdack
 Miconia emendata Wurdack
 Miconia eremita L.Uribe
 Miconia erikasplundii Gamba & Almeda
 Miconia eriocalyx Cogn.
 Miconia erioclada Triana
 Miconia eriodonta DC.
 Miconia ernstii Wurdack
 Miconia erosa Gleason
 Miconia erythrantha Naudin
 Miconia espinosae Markgr.
 Miconia eugenioides Triana
 Miconia evanescens (Almeda) Gamba & Almeda
 Miconia expansa Gleason
 Miconia explicita Wurdack

F
 Miconia falcata Cogn.
 Miconia fallax DC.
 Miconia fanshawei Wurdack
 Miconia fasciculata Gardner
 Miconia favosa Naudin
 Miconia ferreyrae Wurdack
 Miconia ferruginata DC.
 Miconia ferruginea DC.
 Miconia fictilis (J.F.Macbr.) Michelang. & R.Goldenb.
 Miconia filamentosa Gleason
 Miconia filisepala (Urb.) Judd, Bécquer & Majure
 Miconia firma J.F.Macbr.
 Miconia fissa Gleason
 Miconia flaccida Gleason
 Miconia flammea Casar.
 Miconia flavescens Cogn.
 Miconia flavida Cogn. ex Standl.
 Miconia floccosa Cogn.
 Miconia floribunda DC.
 Miconia fluminensis Ule
 Miconia formicaria Gamba & Almeda
 Miconia formonensis (Judd, Skean & Clase) Judd, Bécquer & Majure
 Miconia formosa Cogn.
 Miconia fosbergii Wurdack
 Miconia fosteri Wurdack
 Miconia foveolata Cogn.
 Miconia fragilis Naudin
 Miconia fragrans Cogn.
 Miconia francavillana Cogn.
 Miconia frontinoana Cogn. & Gleason
 Miconia fruticulosa Cogn.
 Miconia fuertesii Cogn.
 Miconia fuliginosa Wurdack
 Miconia funckii Wurdack
 Miconia furfuracea Griseb.

G
 Miconia galactantha Naudin
 Miconia galeiformis Jan.M.Burke & Michelang.
 Miconia gentryi Wurdack
 Miconia gibba Markgr.
 Miconia gigantea Cogn.
 Miconia gilva Cogn.
 Miconia glaberrima Naudin
 Miconia glabrata Cogn.
 Miconia glabrifolia Skean, Judd, Majure & Bécquer
 Miconia glandulifera Cogn.
 Miconia glandulipetala Ocampo & Almeda
 Miconia glandulistyla Wurdack
 Miconia glaucescens Triana
 Miconia glazioviana Cogn.
 Miconia gleasoniana Wurdack
 Miconia globulifera Naudin
 Miconia globuliflora Cham. ex Triana
 Miconia glomerata Triana
 Miconia glomerulifera Cogn.
 Miconia glomeruliflora Judd, Bécquer & Majure
 Miconia glutinosa Cogn.
 Miconia glyptophylla Wurdack
 Miconia gonioclada Triana
 Miconia goniostigma Triana
 Miconia gossypina Triana
 Miconia goudotii Naudin
 Miconia gracilis Triana
 Miconia grandibracteata Judd, Bécquer & Majure
 Miconia grandidentata Almeda
 Miconia grandiflora Cogn.
 Miconia grandifoliata R.Goldenb. & Michelang.
 Miconia granulata (Urb.) Majure & Judd
 Miconia gratissima Benth. ex Triana
 Miconia grayana Cogn.
 Miconia griffisii J.F.Macbr.
 Miconia grisea Cogn.
 Miconia grossidentata Wurdack
 Miconia guaiquinimae Wurdack
 Miconia guajaibonensis Judd, Bécquer & Majure
 Miconia guatemalensis Cogn. ex Donn.Sm.
 Miconia guayaquilensis D.Don

H
 Miconia hadrophylla Wurdack
 Miconia hamata Cogn.
 Miconia harlingii Wurdack
 Miconia haughtii (Gleason) Wurdack
 Miconia heliotropoides Triana
 Miconia hematostemon Naudin
 Miconia hemenostigma Naudin
 Miconia herpetica DC.
 Miconia herrerae Gleason
 Miconia herzogii Cogn.
 Miconia heterochaeta Wurdack
 Miconia heteromera Naudin
 Miconia heterothrix Gleason & Wurdack
 Miconia heterotricha Wurdack
 Miconia hexamera Wurdack
 Miconia hexapetala Wurdack
 Miconia hildeana Kriebel & Almeda
 Miconia hirsuta (Sw.) Judd, Bécquer & Majure
 Miconia hirsutivena Gleason
 Miconia hirta Cogn. ex Rusby
 Miconia hirtella Cogn.
 Miconia hirtistyla Majure & Judd
 Miconia hispidula (Cogn.) Judd, Bécquer & Majure
 Miconia histothrix Wurdack
 Miconia holosericea (L.) DC.
 Miconia hondurensis Donn.Sm.
 Miconia hookeriana Triana
 Miconia hospitalis Wurdack
 Miconia hottensis Ionta, Judd & Skean
 Miconia howardiana Judd, Salzman & Skean
 Miconia huanucensis Wurdack
 Miconia huberi Wurdack
 Miconia huigrensis Wurdack
 Miconia humifusa Jan.M.Burke & Michelang.
 Miconia hutchisonii Wurdack
 Miconia hybophylla (Urb.) Majure & Judd
 Miconia hyemalis A.St.-Hil. & Naudin ex Naudin
 Miconia hygrophila Naudin
 Miconia hylophila Wurdack
 Miconia hymenanthera Triana
 Miconia hymenonervia (Raddi) Cogn.
 Miconia hyperprasina Naudin
 Miconia hypiodes Urb. & Ekman
 Miconia hypoglauca (C.Wright ex Griseb.) Judd, Bécquer & Majure
 Miconia hypoleuca Triana

I
 Miconia ibaguensis Triana
 Miconia ibarrae Almeda
 Miconia icosandra Gleason
 Miconia idiogena Wurdack
 Miconia idroboi Wurdack
 Miconia igniaria Bonpl. ex Naudin
 Miconia iluensis Wurdack
 Miconia imitans Wurdack
 Miconia impetiolaris D.Don
 Miconia impressa (Urb.) Judd, Bécquer & Majure
 Miconia inaequalifolia Triana
 Miconia inaequidens Naudin
 Miconia inaequipetiolata Majure & Judd
 Miconia inamoena Pilg.
 Miconia inanis Cogn. & Gleason
 Miconia incachacana Wurdack
 Miconia incerta (Wurdack) Gamba & Almeda
 Miconia inconspicua Miq.
 Miconia indicoviolacea Gamba, Almeda & Alvear
 Miconia ingens Wurdack
 Miconia innata Gleason
 Miconia insueta Wurdack
 Miconia insularis Gleason
 Miconia intricata Triana
 Miconia ioneura Griseb.
 Miconia irwinii Wurdack

J
 Miconia jahnii Pittier
 Miconia japurensis Cogn.
 Miconia jashaferi Majure & Judd
 Miconia javorkaeana Borhidi
 Miconia jentaculorum Wurdack
 Miconia jimenezii Judd & R.S.Beaman
 Miconia jitotolana Wurdack
 Miconia johnwurdackiana Baumgratz & D'El Rei Souza
 Miconia jorgensenii Wurdack
 Miconia jucunda Triana
 Miconia juruensis Pilg.

K
 Miconia kappellei Almeda & Kriebel
 Miconia kapplerii Naudin
 Miconia karlkrugii Majure & Judd
 Miconia karsticola Judd, Bécquer, Skean & Majure
 Miconia kavanayensis Wurdack
 Miconia klotzschii Triana
 Miconia klugii Gleason
 Miconia koepckeana Wurdack
 Miconia kollmannii R.Goldenb. & Reginato
 Miconia kranzlinii Cogn.
 Miconia kriegeriana Baumgratz & Chiaveg.
 Miconia krugiana (Cogn.) Majure & Judd
 Miconia krugii Cogn.
 Miconia kuntzei Cogn. ex Kuntze

L
 Miconia labiakiana R.Goldenb. & C.V.Martin
 Miconia lacera (Bonpl.) Naudin
 Miconia lachnoclada Wurdack
 Miconia laciniata Wurdack
 Miconia laeta Cogn.
 Miconia laetevirens L.Uribe
 Miconia laevigata DC.
 Miconia laevipilis Wurdack
 Miconia lagunensis Ule
 Miconia lambayequensis Wurdack
 Miconia lamprarrhena Triana
 Miconia lamprophylla Triana
 Miconia lanata Triana
 Miconia lanatifolia Judd, Bécquer & Majure
 Miconia lanceifolia (Urb.) Ionta, Judd & Skean
 Miconia lanceolata DC.
 Miconia langsdorffii Cogn.
 Miconia lanuginosa Ruiz & Pav.
 Miconia lappacea Triana
 Miconia larensis Gleason
 Miconia lasiocalyx Cogn.
 Miconia lasiostyla Gleason
 Miconia lasseri Gleason
 Miconia latecrenata Naudin
 Miconia lateriflora Cogn.
 Miconia latidecurrens Gamba & Almeda
 Miconia latifolia Naudin
 Miconia latistigma Cogn.
 Miconia laurina Naudin
 Miconia laxa Wurdack
 Miconia laxivenula (Wurdack) Gamba & Almeda
 Miconia leandroides Cogn. & Gleason
 Miconia lechleri Triana
 Miconia ledifolia Naudin
 Miconia lehmannii Cogn.
 Miconia leiotricha Wurdack
 Miconia lennartanderssonii Michelang. & R.Goldenb.
 Miconia lenticellata Alain
 Miconia lepidota DC.
 Miconia leptantha Urb. & Ekman
 Miconia leucocarpa DC.
 Miconia licrophora Wurdack
 Miconia liebmannii Cogn.
 Miconia liesneri Wurdack
 Miconia ligustrina Triana
 Miconia ligustroides Naudin
 Miconia lilacina Triana
 Miconia limitaris Wurdack
 Miconia limoides (Urb.) Majure & Judd
 Miconia lithophila L.Uribe
 Miconia littlei Wurdack
 Miconia livida Triana
 Miconia lonchophylla Naudin
 Miconia longibracteata Almeda
 Miconia longicuspidata S.S.Renner & R.Goldenb.
 Miconia longicuspis Cogn.
 Miconia longidentata Michelang. & W.Meier
 Miconia longifolia (Aubl.) DC.
 Miconia longiracemosa Gleason
 Miconia longisepala Gleason
 Miconia longisetosa Wurdack
 Miconia longispicata Triana
 Miconia loretensis Pilg.
 Miconia loreyoides Triana
 Miconia lourteigiana Wurdack
 Miconia loxensis DC.
 Miconia luciana Gleason
 Miconia lucida Naudin
 Miconia lugonis Wurdack
 Miconia lugubris Cogn.
 Miconia lundellii (Wurdack) Almeda
 Miconia lurida Cogn.
 Miconia luteola Cogn.
 Miconia lutescens DC.
 Miconia luteynii Wurdack
 Miconia lymanii Wurdack

M
 Miconia macayana Judd & Skean
 Miconia macbrydeana Wurdack
 Miconia machinazana C.Ulloa & D.A.Neill
 Miconia macrantha Triana
 Miconia macrocarpa (Urb. & Ekman) Judd & Ionta
 Miconia macrodon (Naudin) Wurdack
 Miconia macrothyrsa Benth.
 Miconia macrotis Cogn.
 Miconia maculata (Urb. & Ekman) Judd, Bécquer & Majure
 Miconia macuxi Meirelles, Caddah & R.Goldenb.
 Miconia madisonii Wurdack
 Miconia madrensis Standl.
 Miconia maestrensis Judd, Bécquer & Majure
 Miconia magdalenae Triana
 Miconia magnifolia Gamba & Almeda
 Miconia maguirei Gleason
 Miconia majalis Cogn.
 Miconia malatestae J.F.Macbr.
 Miconia manauara R.Goldenb., Caddah & Michelang.
 Miconia mandonii Cogn. ex Britton
 Miconia manicata Cogn. & Gleason
 Miconia mansfeldiana Urb. & Ekman
 Miconia mapirensis Gleason
 Miconia marginata Triana
 Miconia mariae Wurdack
 Miconia marigotiana (Urb. & Ekman) Majure & Judd
 Miconia maroana Wurdack
 Miconia martiniana Gleason
 Miconia martinicensis Cogn.
 Miconia matthaei Naudin
 Miconia mattogrossensis Hoehne
 Miconia maximilianea DC.
 Miconia maximowicziana Cogn.
 Miconia mazanana J.F.Macbr.
 Miconia mazatecana de Santiago
 Miconia mcphersonii Almeda & Penneys
 Miconia mcvaughii Wurdack
 Miconia media Naudin
 Miconia mediocris Wurdack
 Miconia medusa Gleason
 Miconia megalantha Gleason
 Miconia melanotricha (Triana) Gleason
 Miconia melinonis Naudin
 Miconia mellina DC.
 Miconia membranacea Triana
 Miconia mendoncaei Cogn.
 Miconia meridensis Triana
 Miconia mesmeana Gleason
 Miconia metallica Triana
 Miconia mexicana Naudin
 Miconia micayana Wurdack
 Miconia michelangeliana R.Goldenb. & L.Kollmann
 Miconia micrantha Cogn.
 Miconia micropetala Cogn.
 Miconia miles-morgani J.F.Macbr.
 Miconia militis Wurdack
 Miconia mimica Gleason
 Miconia minuta Gleason
 Miconia minutiflora (Bonpl.) DC.
 Miconia miocarpa Naudin
 Miconia mirabilis (Aubl.) L.O.Williams
 Miconia mituana Wurdack
 Miconia mocquerysii Wurdack
 Miconia modica J.F.Macbr.
 Miconia moensis (Britton) Alain
 Miconia molesta Cogn.
 Miconia molinopampana Wurdack
 Miconia mollicula Triana
 Miconia mollis Triana
 Miconia molybdea Naudin
 Miconia monciona Urb. & Ekman
 Miconia monzoniensis Cogn.
 Miconia moorei Wurdack
 Miconia morii Almeda
 Miconia mornicola A.C.Nicolson
 Miconia mouraei Cogn.
 Miconia mulleola Wurdack
 Miconia multiflora Cogn. ex Britton
 Miconia multiglandulosa Cogn.
 Miconia multinervia Cogn.
 Miconia multiplinervia Cogn.
 Miconia multispicata Naudin
 Miconia munchicana (Lozano & N.Ruiz-R.) Almeda & Alvear
 Miconia muricata Triana
 Miconia mutabilis Triana
 Miconia mutisiana Markgr. ex Cuatrec.
 Miconia myriantha Benth.
 Miconia myrtillifolia Naudin

N
 Miconia namandensis Wurdack
 Miconia nambyquarae Hoehne
 Miconia nanophylla Judd, Bécquer & Majure
 Miconia napoana Wurdack
 Miconia nasella Wurdack
 Miconia navifolia Ionta, Judd & Skean
 Miconia navioensis Wurdack
 Miconia neblinensis Wurdack
 Miconia neei Jan.M.Burke & Michelang.
 Miconia nematophora Urb. & Ekman
 Miconia neocoronata Gamba & Almeda
 Miconia neomicrantha Judd & Skean
 Miconia neriifolia Triana
 Miconia nervosa Triana
 Miconia neurotricha Cogn.
 Miconia nigricans Cogn.
 Miconia nigripes Cogn. & Gleason
 Miconia nitida Naudin
 Miconia nitidissima Cogn.
 Miconia nobilis Gleason
 Miconia nodosa Cogn.
 Miconia nordestina R.Goldenb. & E.C.O.Chagas
 Miconia norlindii (Urb.) Majure & Judd
 Miconia notabilis Triana
 Miconia novemnervia Naudin
 Miconia nubicola Proctor
 Miconia nutans Donn.Sm.
 Miconia nystroemii Ekman

O
 Miconia obconica Gleason & Wurdack
 Miconia obliqua Gleason
 Miconia oblongifolia Cogn.
 Miconia obovata Triana
 Miconia obscura Naudin
 Miconia obtusa Triana
 Miconia ochracea Triana
 Miconia octopetala Cogn.
 Miconia odoratissima L.A.Cárdenas
 Miconia oellgaardii E.Cotton
 Miconia oinochrophylla Donn.Sm.
 Miconia oldemanii Wurdack
 Miconia oligantha Wurdack
 Miconia oligotricha Naudin
 Miconia ombrophila Wurdack
 Miconia onaensis Wurdack
 Miconia onychocalyx Gilli
 Miconia opacifolia J.F.Macbr.
 Miconia oraria Wurdack
 Miconia orcheotoma Naudin
 Miconia oreogena Wurdack
 Miconia orescia L.Uribe
 Miconia organensis Gardner
 Miconia ossaeifolia Urb. & Ekman
 Miconia ottikeri J.F.Macbr.
 Miconia ottoschmidtii (Urb.) Majure & Judd
 Miconia ovalifolia Cogn.
 Miconia ovata Cogn.
 Miconia ovatifolia (Urb.) Judd, Bécquer & Majure

P
 Miconia pachydonta Gleason
 Miconia pachyphylla Cogn.
 Miconia paeminosa Wurdack
 Miconia pagnolensis Majure & Judd
 Miconia pailasana Wurdack
 Miconia paleacea Cogn.
 Miconia palenquensis (Wurdack) Gamba & Almeda
 Miconia paludigena Wurdack
 Miconia pandurata Triana
 Miconia paniculata Naudin
 Miconia papillosa Naudin
 Miconia papillosperma R.Goldenb. & Michelang.
 Miconia paradisica Wurdack
 Miconia paradoxa Triana
 Miconia paraguayensis Cogn.
 Miconia paralimoides Majure & Judd
 Miconia parvifolia Cogn.
 Miconia paspaloides Gleason
 Miconia pastazana Wurdack
 Miconia pastoensis Triana
 Miconia paucidens DC.
 Miconia pauperula Triana
 Miconia pausana Wurdack
 Miconia pavoniana Naudin
 Miconia pedicellata Cogn.
 Miconia pedunculata Majure & Judd
 Miconia penduliflora Cogn.
 Miconia penicillata Gleason
 Miconia penningtonii Wurdack
 Miconia pennipilis Cogn.
 Miconia pentlandii Naudin
 Miconia pepericarpa DC.
 Miconia perelegans Urb.
 Miconia pergamentacea Cogn.
 Miconia perijensis Wurdack
 Miconia pernettifolia Triana
 Miconia perobscura Wurdack
 Miconia persicariifolia Cogn.
 Miconia perturbata Wurdack
 Miconia peruviana Cogn.
 Miconia petersonii Urb.
 Miconia petroniana Cogn. & Saldanha
 Miconia petropolitana Cogn.
 Miconia phaeochaeta Wurdack
 Miconia phaeophylla Triana
 Miconia phaeotricha Naudin
 Miconia phanerostila Pilg.
 Miconia phlebodes Wurdack
 Miconia phrynosomaderma Majure & Judd
 Miconia pichinchensis Benth.
 Miconia picinguabensis R.Goldenb. & A.B.Martins
 Miconia pilaloensis Wurdack
 Miconia pileata DC.
 Miconia piperifolia Triana
 Miconia pisinna Wurdack
 Miconia pisinniflora Wurdack
 Miconia pittieri Cogn.
 Miconia platypoda Gleason
 Miconia plena Gleason
 Miconia plethorica Naudin
 Miconia plukenetii Naudin
 Miconia plumifera Triana
 Miconia poecilantha L.Uribe
 Miconia poeppigii Triana
 Miconia polita Gleason
 Miconia polyandra Gardner
 Miconia polychaeta Wurdack
 Miconia polygama Cogn.
 Miconia polyneura Triana
 Miconia polytopica Wurdack
 Miconia poortmannii (Cogn.) Wurdack
 Miconia popayanensis Wurdack
 Miconia porphyrotricha (Markgr.) Wurdack
 Miconia portogallensis J.R.Santiago & F.A.Michelang.
 Miconia portoricensis (Alain) Ionta, Judd & Skean
 Miconia pozoensis Wurdack
 Miconia pozuzoana L.A.Cárdenas & Michelang.
 Miconia prancei Wurdack
 Miconia prasina (Sw.) DC.
 Miconia prasinifolia Gleason
 Miconia pratensis Judd, Bécquer & Majure
 Miconia prietoi Wurdack
 Miconia procumbens (Gleason) Wurdack
 Miconia prominens Wurdack
 Miconia protuberans Wurdack
 Miconia pseudoaplostachya Cogn.
 Miconia pseudocapsularis Wurdack
 Miconia pseudocentrophora Cogn.
 Miconia pseudoeichleri Cogn.
 Miconia pseudonervosa Cogn.
 Miconia pseudopinetorum (Borhidi & O.Muñiz) Judd, Bécquer & Majure
 Miconia pseudoradula Cogn. & Gleason
 Miconia pseudorigida Proctor
 Miconia psychrophila Naudin
 Miconia pterocaulon Triana
 Miconia pteroclada Urb.
 Miconia puberula Cogn.
 Miconia pubicalyx Gleason
 Miconia pubipetala Miq.
 Miconia pujana Markgr.
 Miconia pulchra Cogn.
 Miconia pulgari J.F.Macbr.
 Miconia pulverata Judd, Bécquer & Majure
 Miconia pulverulenta Ruiz & Pav.
 Miconia pulvinata Gleason
 Miconia punctata (Desr.) D.Don
 Miconia punctibullata M.E.Morales, Michelang. & F.González
 Miconia punicea Wurdack
 Miconia puracensis Wurdack
 Miconia purulensis Donn.Sm.
 Miconia pusilliflora Naudin
 Miconia pustulata Naudin
 Miconia pycnantha (Urb. & Ekman) Ionta, Judd & Skean
 Miconia pycnoneura Urb.
 Miconia pyramidalis DC.
 Miconia pyrifolia Naudin

Q
 Miconia quadrangularis Naudin
 Miconia quadrialata S.S.Renner & S.Beck
 Miconia quadridomius Gamba & Almeda
 Miconia quadrifolia Naudin
 Miconia quadripora Wurdack
 Miconia quinquenervia (Mill.) Gamba & Almeda
 Miconia quintuplinervia Cogn.

R
 Miconia rabenii Cogn.
 Miconia racemifera (DC.) Triana
 Miconia racemosa (Aubl.) DC.
 Miconia radicans (Cogn. ex Donn.Sm.) Gamba & Almeda
 Miconia radula Cogn.
 Miconia radulifolia Naudin
 Miconia ramboi Brade
 Miconia rava Wurdack
 Miconia ravenii Wurdack
 Miconia reburrosa Wurdack
 Miconia reclinata Naudin
 Miconia recondita Wurdack
 Miconia reducens Triana
 Miconia reflexipila Wurdack
 Miconia regelii Cogn.
 Miconia reitziana (Cogn. & Gleason) Gamba & Almeda
 Miconia remotiflora Urb.
 Miconia renatogoldenbergii Meirelles & Bacci
 Miconia renatoi Gamba & Almeda
 Miconia renneri E.Cotton
 Miconia resima Naudin
 Miconia resimoides Cogn.
 Miconia reticulata Triana
 Miconia reticulatovenosa Judd, Bécquer & Majure
 Miconia retusa Pilg.
 Miconia rhodantha Wurdack
 Miconia rhombifolia Alain
 Miconia rhonhofiae Markgr.
 Miconia rhytidophylla Naudin
 Miconia ricardoi Kriebel & Almeda
 Miconia rigens Naudin
 Miconia rigida Triana
 Miconia rigidissima Urb. & Ekman
 Miconia rimachii Wurdack
 Miconia rimalis Naudin
 Miconia rimbachii Wurdack
 Miconia riparia Triana
 Miconia rivalis Wurdack
 Miconia rivetii Danguy & Cherm.
 Miconia robinsoniana Cogn.
 Miconia robusta Cogn.
 Miconia roraimensis Ule
 Miconia rosea Gleason
 Miconia rotundifolia Naudin
 Miconia rubens Naudin
 Miconia rubiginosa (Bonpl.) DC.
 Miconia rubricans Triana
 Miconia rubrisetulosa Ionta, Judd & Skean
 Miconia rufa Triana
 Miconia rufescens (Aubl.) DC.
 Miconia rufibarbis (Triana) Gamba & Almeda
 Miconia ruficalyx Gleason
 Miconia rufipila Triana
 Miconia rufiramea Wurdack
 Miconia rufostellulata Pittier
 Miconia rugifolia Triana
 Miconia rugosa Triana
 Miconia ruizii Naudin
 Miconia ruizteranii Wurdack
 Miconia rupestris Ule
 Miconia rupticalyx Wurdack
 Miconia rusbyana Cogn.
 Miconia ruschiana Caddah & R.Goldenb.
 Miconia russea Wurdack
 Miconia rzedowskii de Santiago

S
 Miconia sagotiana Cogn.
 Miconia saldanhaei Cogn.
 Miconia salebrosa Wurdack
 Miconia salicifolia Naudin
 Miconia saltuensis Wurdack
 Miconia samanensis Urb.
 Miconia sancti-philippi Naudin
 Miconia sandemanii Wurdack
 Miconia sanguinea Triana
 Miconia santanana Judd & Skean
 Miconia santaremensis Wurdack
 Miconia santaritensis Almeda
 Miconia sarmentosa Cogn.
 Miconia sastrei Wurdack
 Miconia savannarum R.O.Williams
 Miconia saxatilis J.F.Macbr.
 Miconia saxicola Brandegee
 Miconia scaberrima Judd, Bécquer & Majure
 Miconia scabra Cogn.
 Miconia scabrosa (L.) Ionta, Judd & Skean
 Miconia scalpta (Vent.) Ionta, Judd & Skean
 Miconia schippii Standl.
 Miconia schlechtendalii Cogn.
 Miconia schnellii Wurdack
 Miconia schunkei Wurdack
 Miconia schwackei Cogn.
 Miconia sciurea L.Uribe
 Miconia sclerophylla Triana
 Miconia scutata Gleason
 Miconia secunda R.A.Howard & E.A.Kellogg
 Miconia secundiflora Cogn.
 Miconia secundifolia Cogn.
 Miconia selleana Urb. & Ekman
 Miconia sellowiana Naudin
 Miconia semisterilis Gleason
 Miconia seposita Wurdack
 Miconia septentrionalis Judd & R.S.Beaman
 Miconia serialis DC.
 Miconia serrulata (DC.) Naudin
 Miconia sessilifolia Naudin
 Miconia sessilis Gamba & Almeda
 Miconia seticaulis Wurdack
 Miconia setosa Wurdack
 Miconia setoso-ciliata Cogn.
 Miconia setulosa Cogn.
 Miconia shaferi Cogn.
 Miconia shepherdii R.Goldenb. & Reginato
 Miconia silicicola Gleason
 Miconia silverstonei Wurdack
 Miconia simplex Triana
 Miconia sintenisii Cogn.
 Miconia skeaniana Judd
 Miconia smaragdina Naudin
 Miconia smithii Cogn.
 Miconia sneidernii Wurdack
 Miconia sodiroi Wurdack
 Miconia solearis (Naudin) Gamba & Almeda
 Miconia sordida Triana
 Miconia sparrei Wurdack
 Miconia spatellophora Gleason
 Miconia speciosa Naudin
 Miconia spennerostachya Naudin
 Miconia sphagnicola Urb. & Ekman
 Miconia spicellata Bonpl. ex Naudin
 Miconia spichigeri Wurdack
 Miconia spiciformis Gamba & Almeda
 Miconia spinulidentata Cogn. & Gleason
 Miconia spinulosa Naudin
 Miconia spiraeifolia Triana
 Miconia splendens (Sw.) Griseb.
 Miconia sprucei Triana
 Miconia squamulosa Triana
 Miconia staminea DC.
 Miconia staphidioides Triana
 Miconia steinbachii Markgr.
 Miconia stelligera Cogn.
 Miconia stellulata Gleason
 Miconia stenobotrys Naudin
 Miconia stenocardia Cogn.
 Miconia stenophylla Wurdack
 Miconia stenostachya DC.
 Miconia stenourea Triana
 Miconia stephananthera Ule
 Miconia sterilis Gleason
 Miconia stevensiana Almeda
 Miconia steyermarkii Gleason
 Miconia stipitata Gleason
 Miconia stipularis Naudin
 Miconia striata Cogn.
 Miconia strigosa (Triana) Wurdack
 Miconia stylosa Cogn.
 Miconia suaveolens Wurdack
 Miconia subalpina Gleason
 Miconia subandicola Wurdack
 Miconia subcompressa Urb.
 Miconia subcordata Cogn.
 Miconia suberosa Meirelles & R.Goldenb.
 Miconia subglabra Cogn.
 Miconia submacrophylla Gleason
 Miconia subnodosa Triana
 Miconia suborbicularis Cogn.
 Miconia subsessilifolia Wurdack
 Miconia subsimplex Pilg.
 Miconia subspicata Wurdack
 Miconia subulipetala Wurdack
 Miconia subvernicosa Cogn.
 Miconia sulcata J.F.Macbr.
 Miconia summa Cuatrec.
 Miconia superba Ule
 Miconia superposita Wurdack
 Miconia sylvatica Naud.
 Miconia symplectocaulos Pilg.
 Miconia symplocoidea Triana

T
 Miconia tabayensis Wurdack
 Miconia tacanensis Wurdack
 Miconia tachirensis Wurdack
 Miconia talamancensis Almeda
 Miconia tamana Wurdack
 Miconia tenensis Markgr.
 Miconia tentaculicapitata Majure & Judd
 Miconia tentaculifera Naudin
 Miconia tenuis Triana
 Miconia teotepecensis de Santiago
 Miconia tephrodes Wurdack
 Miconia tepicana Standl.
 Miconia terboghii Wurdack
 Miconia terera Naudin
 Miconia ternatifolia Triana
 Miconia tetragona Cogn.
 Miconia tetragonoloba (Cogn.) Judd, Bécquer & Majure
 Miconia tetrandra D.Don
 Miconia tetraptera (Cogn.) Ionta, Judd & Skean
 Miconia tetrasperma Gleason
 Miconia tetraspermoides Wurdack
 Miconia tetrastoma Naudin
 Miconia tetrazygioides Urb. & Ekman
 Miconia thaminantha Wurdack
 Miconia theizans (Bonpl.) Cogn.
 Miconia thomasiana DC.
 Miconia thyrsiflora Naud.
 Miconia thysanophylla Wurdack
 Miconia tiliifolia Naudin
 Miconia tillettii Wurdack
 Miconia tinifolia Naudin
 Miconia tiri Triana
 Miconia titanophylla Gleason
 Miconia tixixensis Standl. & Steyerm.
 Miconia tomentosa (Rich.) D.Don
 Miconia tonduzii Cogn.
 Miconia toroi Gleason
 Miconia tovarensis Cogn.
 Miconia traillii Cogn.
 Miconia transversa Gleason
 Miconia trianae Cogn.
 Miconia triangularis Gleason
 Miconia tricaudata Wurdack
 Miconia trichogona J.F.Macbr.
 Miconia trichophora Gleason
 Miconia trichotoma DC.
 Miconia trimera Wurdack
 Miconia trinervia D.Don ex Loudon
 Miconia triplinervis Ruiz & Pav.
 Miconia tristis Spring. ex Mart.
 Miconia trujillensis Wurdack
 Miconia truncata Triana
 Miconia tschudyoides Cogn.
 Miconia tuberculata Triana
 Miconia tubulosa Gleason
 Miconia tuckeri Gleason
 Miconia tuerckheimii Cogn.
 Miconia turgida Gleason
 Miconia turquinensis Urb. & Ekman

U
 Miconia ulmarioides Naudin
 Miconia umbellata (Mill.) Judd & Ionta
 Miconia umbriensis Wurdack
 Miconia umbrosa Cogn.
 Miconia undata Triana
 Miconia uninervis Alain
 Miconia urbaniana Cogn.
 Miconia urceolata Urb. & Urb.
 Miconia uribei Wurdack
 Miconia urophylla DC.
 Miconia urticoides Triana
 Miconia uvida Wurdack
 Miconia uvifera Naudin

V
 Miconia vaccinioides Naudin
 Miconia valentinensis Bacci & R.Goldenb.
 Miconia valeriana (Standl.) Wurdack
 Miconia valida Cogn.
 Miconia vallensis Wurdack
 Miconia valtherii Naudin
 Miconia vargasii Wurdack
 Miconia variabilis Gamba & Almeda
 Miconia vegaensis (Cogn.) Judd, Bécquer & Majure
 Miconia velutina Triana
 Miconia venulosa Wurdack
 Miconia veraguensis Gamba & Almeda
 Miconia verrucosa Cogn.
 Miconia versicolor Naudin
 Miconia vesca Wurdack
 Miconia vestita Almeda
 Miconia victorinii Alain
 Miconia vilhenensis Wurdack
 Miconia villonacensis Wurdack
 Miconia violacea Cogn.
 Miconia virescens (Vahl) Triana
 Miconia viscidula Urb. & Cogn.
 Miconia vismioides Triana
 Miconia vitiflora J.F.Macbr.
 Miconia vittata Cogn.
 Miconia voronovii Gleason

W
 Miconia wagneri J.F.Macbr.
 Miconia walterjuddii Bécquer & Michelang.
 Miconia warmingiana Cogn.
 Miconia weberbaueri Cogn.
 Miconia weddellii Naudin
 Miconia willdenowii Klotzsch ex Naudin
 Miconia wittii Ule
 Miconia wolfei Wurdack
 Miconia woodsii (Judd & Skean) Ionta, Judd & Skean
 Miconia woytkowskii Wurdack
 Miconia wrightiana (Griseb.) Greuter & R.Rankin
 Miconia wurdackii L.Uribe

X
 Miconia xenotricha Urb. & Ekman

Y
 Miconia yatuensis Wurdack
 Miconia yunquensis Judd, Bécquer & Majure

Z
 Miconia zamorensis Gleason
 Miconia zanonii Judd, Skean & Beaman
 Miconia zarucchii Wurdack
 Miconia zemurrayana Standl. & L.O.Williams
 Miconia zubenetana J.F.Macbr.

References

L
Miconia